Aino Tamm (23 December 1864 in Kuressaare, Tarvastu Parish – 7 December 1945 in Tallinn) was an Estonian singer and singing pedagog.

1886-1889 she studied singing in St. Petersburg at several private teachers. Her singing career started in 1891 in St. Petersburg and also in Estonia. In 1900 she introduced Estonian vocal music and folk music at the Paris Expo Porte de Versailles.

From 1923 until 1945, she taught singing at the Tallinn Conservatory. Students included: Tooni Kroon, Eino Uuli, Meta Kodanipork, Aleksander Tamm.

References

Further reading
 L. Saul. Aino Tamm. Tallinn, 1978
 J. Aavik. Aino Tamme 35-aastase muusikalise tegevuse puhul. – Muusikaleht 1926,1, 2, 5, 6
 Anna Haava, Miina Hermann, Aino Tamm. Tallinn, 1934
 Kolmveerand sajandit elu ja poolsajandit laulu. – Uus Eesti, 17 December 1939
 A. V. Ühe laululinnu kunstitee. – Uus Eesti, 22 December 1939
 L. Saul. Aino Tamm 75-aastane. – Muusikaleht 1940, 2
 N. Murrik-Polonsky. Aino Tamm. – Muusikaleht 1934, 11
 L. Aader. Aino Tammest sai laulja reedetud armastuse tõttu. – Mulkide almanak, 2009, 19
 A. Põldmäe. Aino Tamm – 150. Eesti lauluema meenutuseks. – Kultuur ja Elu 2014, 4
 K. Kiis. Aino Tamm – laulmisesse armunud. – Muusika 2015, 4

1864 births
1945 deaths
19th-century Estonian women singers
20th-century Estonian women singers
Estonian educators
Academic staff of the Estonian Academy of Music and Theatre
People from Viljandi Parish